Shanghai Jiangwan Airport was an airport located in Yangpu District of northeast Shanghai, China. It was closed in 1994 and the site has been redeveloped into the New Jiangwan City (新江湾城) neighbourhood.

History
The airport was formerly known as Kiangwan Airfield. At the end of World War II it was used by the United States Army Air Forces as the headquarters of the 1st Combat Cargo Group, its primary mission being the airlift of Chinese troops in and out of the Shanghai region.  The airfield was also the home of the Air Technical Service Command "Shanghai Air Depot", which opened in October 1945 to supervise the deposition of Allied and captured Japanese aircraft in China. Kiangwan Airfield operated Air Transport Command services and flights from Shanghai as part of its Western Pacific Wing until 31 December 1947 when the ATC facilities were closed, and American forces left the area.

Jiangwan remained in operation as a military airport under the People's Liberation Army from 1949 onward. The property was turned over to the city of Shanghai in 1997 for redevelopment as a residential area and a park.

On 1 October 1999, the nearby Shanghai Pudong International Airport officially opened.

References

Further reading
 Maurer, Maurer. Air Force Combat Units Of World War II. Maxwell Air Force Base, Alabama: Office of Air Force History, 1983. 521 p.

External links
 Airfields & Seaplane Anchorages China pacificwrecks.com

Airports in Shanghai
Defunct airports in China
Airfields of the United States Army Air Forces in China
1994 disestablishments in China